Bonson may refer to:

People
 Bonson (surname)

Places
 Bonson, Alpes-Maritimes, a commune in the department of Alpes-Maritimes, France
 Bonson, Loire, a commune in the department of Loire, France
 Bonson, Somerset, a village in Somerset, United Kingdom

See also
 FJEP Bonson, korfball club